Germany was represented by Michelle in the Eurovision Song Contest 2001 with the song "Wer Liebe lebt", composed by Gino Trovatello and Matthias Stingl with lyrics by Eva Richter, was chosen to represent Germany.

Before Eurovision

Countdown Grand Prix 2001 
The final took place on 2 March 2001 at the Preussag Arena in Hanover, hosted by Axel Bulthaupt. The winner was chosen in two rounds of televoting, the first round to select the top 3, and the second to decide the winner. Michelle got the highest number of votes from the audience in the second round of voting and was proclaimed winner and entrant for Germany at the Eurovision Song Contest 2001.

At Eurovision
Michelle performed 19th on the night of the final, following Poland and preceding Estonia. At the close of voting, she had received 66 points, finishing in 8th place out of 23 contestants.

Voting

References

2001
Countries in the Eurovision Song Contest 2001
Eurovision
Eurovision